Mads Boe Mikkelsen (born 11 December 1999) is a professional football player who plays for Klaksvíkar Ítróttarfelag. Born in Denmark, he plays for the Faroe Islands national team.

Career
Mikkelsen has his football upbringing in Aarhus, AGF where he came to the club at an age of 11 years. Mads Mikkelsen started playing football in a small club from the suburb of Aarhus, Kolt-Hasselager. Mads Mikkelsen signed his first contract at an age of 16 years, a youth contract lasting three years with Aarhus, AGF. After his contract expired he signed a four-year professional deal with Vendsyssel FF.

On August 6, 2018 Mikkelsen made his Superliga debut  appearing as a substitute against FC Nordsjælland. Four days later on August 10, 2018 Mikkelsen made his first start and scored his first league goal, netting the opener in a 1-1 draw at home against Vejle Boldklub.

International career
Mikkelsen was born in Denmark, and is of Faroese descent through his mother. is a youth international for Denmark, having represented the Denmark U17s before switching to represent the Faroe Islands U21s. He was called up to represent the Faroe Islands national team for UEFA Nations League matches in June 2022.

Honours
Havnar Bóltfelag
Faroe Islands Premier League: 2020
Faroe Islands Cup: 2020
Faroe Islands Super Cup: 2021

Klaksvíkar Ítróttarfelag
Faroe Islands Super Cup: 2022

References

External links
Mads Mikkelsen at DBU

1999 births
Living people
Faroese footballers
Faroe Islands international footballers
Faroe Islands under-21 international footballers
Danish men's footballers
Denmark youth international footballers
Danish people of Faroese descent
Association football midfielders
Aarhus Gymnastikforening players
Vendsyssel FF players
Havnar Bóltfelag players
Danish 1st Division players
Danish Superliga players
Faroe Islands Premier League players